Elvin Mims (born December 23, 1979) is an American professional basketball player who last played for the London Lightning of the NBL Canada. He has previously played in multiple leagues in the United States and in Iceland as well as Canada. Prior to going pro, from 1998 to 2002, Mims played college basketball for Northwest Florida State College and Southern Mississippi University.

College career
Mims started played college basketball for Northwest Florida State College in 1998, moving to Southern Mississippi University in 2000 and remaining there for two seasons.

Playing career
Mims signed with KR of the Úrvalsdeild karla in end of February 2004. He appeared in KR's last two game of the regular season, averaging 12.5 points and 5.0 rebounds. In the playoffs, he averaged 20.3 points and 8.7 rebounds in KR's first round loss to Grindavík.

References

External links
 
 Draft Express
 Profile at Foxsports Pulse

1979 births
Living people
American expatriate basketball people in Australia
American expatriate basketball people in Canada
American expatriate basketball people in Iceland
American men's basketball players
Basketball players from Chicago
London Lightning players
Northwest Florida State Raiders men's basketball players
People from Escambia County, Florida
Player-coaches
Southern Miss Golden Eagles basketball players
Townsville Crocodiles players
Yakima Sun Kings players
Úrvalsdeild karla (basketball) players
Power forwards (basketball)